Alan Freeman  is a Gaelic footballer who plays for Aghamore and the Mayo county team.

He came on as a substitute in the 2012 All-Ireland Senior Football Championship Final which Mayo lost by 0–13 to 2–11 against Donegal. In the 2013 All-Ireland final, Freeman started at full forward as Mayo lost by a point to Dublin.

References

Living people
Gaelic football forwards
Mayo inter-county Gaelic footballers
People from Castlebar
Year of birth missing (living people)